Advance was one of the great Thoroughbred colts of the New Zealand turf. Crowd-pleasing, front-running colt won good races up to 1-1/2 miles, but "The Black Demon" was best known as a superior weight-carrier, one of the best, if not the best, of all time in New Zealand—in his 19 wins he carried more than 9 st. in 13 of them—and some rank him as a better horse than  Carbine. 

This black colt was foaled in 1896, Bred at Parawanui in the Rangitikei district of the North Island (NZ) by Donald Fraser, he was leased to J.W. Abbott and J.D. Duncan, who raced under the name "Douglas Gordon and J. Monk," and trained by Joe Prosser and ridden by Charlie Jenkins. He won his only two races as a juvenile, and at age three won ten races, seven of them in a row

Breeding

His dam, Laurel, a chestnut with a flaxen mane and tail, won twenty races for Fraser in a long career, interrupted when she was nine to produce her first foal, and then put back into racing. Her daughter Lorelei (1891, by Cruiser) won the Manawatu Cup (12 furlongs), and other races. Laurel was in-bred to Riddlesworth (1837, by Emilius - Bee-in-a-Bonnet, imported 1843; also sire of Sybil, Family C - 20 ) whose blood was favored by Fraser).

Age 3
 1900 AJC Autumn Stakes, 

 1900 Wanganui Cup,

 1900 Wanganui Stakes,

 1900 Dunedin Cup, 

 1900 Auckland Easter Handicap

 1900 Century Stakes, 

 1900 Autumn Handicap,

Age 4

Advance had a number of New Zealand wins:

 1901 Wanganui Stakes

 1901 The Canterbury Cup

 1901 CJC Jubilee Cup

 1901 Auckland Plate 

After this Advance and the owners went to Australia, where they picked up two seconds and a third, and won: 

 1901 Sydney's Autumn Stakes, 

 1901 All Aged Stakes

Later career

He had a bout of influenza which affected his breathing and he was sidelined at age five but in 1903 he came back to win the: 

 1903 Wellington Cup 

 1903 WRC Zealandia Handicap 

 Wanganui Jackson Stakes.

He was also second in the Wanganui Cup.

Stud record
Retired to Fraser's stud he sired nothing like himself; his best was the sprinting filly Equitas (Family C - 20), winner of the CJC Stewards' Handicap and other good races, and later dam of the 1919 Wellington Cup and 1920 New Zealand Cup winner Oratress.

See also

 Thoroughbred racing in New Zealand

References

1896 racehorse births
Racehorses bred in New Zealand
Racehorses trained in New Zealand
Wellington Cup winners
Thoroughbred family C17